Elections to Inverclyde Council were held on 6 April 1995, the same day as other local elections in Scotland. This was the first election to Inverclyde since the creation of the Scottish Unitary Authorities under the Local Government etc. (Scotland) Act 1994

Election Results

Ward Results

References

1995
1995 Scottish local elections